Mario Georgiev (born 23 December 1987) is a Bulgarian football player, currently playing for Brestnik 1948 as a midfielder.

External links 
  Profile

1987 births
Living people
Bulgarian footballers
First Professional Football League (Bulgaria) players
Second Professional Football League (Bulgaria) players
PFC Lokomotiv Plovdiv players
Association football midfielders